Veluws is a Westphalian dialect which is spoken on the Veluwe, in the northwest of Gelderland, in central Netherlands. The language was recognized by the government of the Netherlands in 1996 (as part of Low Saxon).

Dialects

Veluws is usually divided into two main dialects, West-Veluws and Oost-Veluws (East Veluws), these two dialects are reasonably similar but differ in grammar. For example: in Oost-Veluws it is said  ('you are working') and in West-Veluws  ('you are working').

West-Veluws has more influenced from Dutch. Typically the closer one gets to the border with Oost-Veluws, the more the dialects differ from Standard Dutch. The latter has more Low Saxon influence. In Hattem, the northeastern part where Oost-Veluws is spoken, it has more Sallandic influences.

See also
 West-Veluws dialect
 Oost-Veluws dialect

References

Dutch Low Saxon
Westphalian dialects
Languages of the Netherlands
Culture of Gelderland